State Route 9 (SR 9) is one of the longest state highways in the U.S. state of Alabama. From the Florida state line north to Montgomery, SR 9 is the unsigned partner route of U.S. Route 331 (US 331). As a signed route, the southern terminus of SR 9 is at its junction with US 231 and SR 21 at Wetumpka, and the northern terminus of the route is at the Georgia state line east of Cedar Bluff, where the route becomes State Route 20 (SR 20).

Route description

US 331 enters Alabama from Florida near the border town of Florala. The route is one of several routes used to connect Alabama and points north with the Gulf of Mexico beaches in northwest Florida. From the state line to Montgomery, US 331 and SR 9 follow a north–south orientation. North of Montgomery, SR 9 as a standalone route assumes a more northeast–southwest orientation, and passes through rural areas and small towns in the eastern part of the state.

Major intersections

See also

References

009
Highways in Montgomery, Alabama
Transportation in Covington County, Alabama
Transportation in Crenshaw County, Alabama
Transportation in Montgomery County, Alabama
Transportation in Coosa County, Alabama
Transportation in Clay County, Alabama
Transportation in Cleburne County, Alabama
Transportation in Calhoun County, Alabama
Transportation in Cherokee County, Alabama